Ernest Raeford "Mule" Shirley (May 24, 1901 – August 4, 1955) was a Major League Baseball player who played first base during parts of the   and  seasons. He  batted and threw left-handed. For the 1924 Washington Senators, he logged 100 regular season at bats. He appeared in three games of the 1924 World Series which the Senators won, registering one hit in two at bats, batting in one and scoring once. Shirley attended The University of North Carolina at Chapel Hill from 1921 to 1923 where he was a member of Theta Chi fraternity. He was the son of Octavius Shirley (March 4, 1884 – May 1, 1967) and Anna Shingleton (Shirley) (July 18, 1882 – September 30, 1944).

External links

Ernest "Mule" Shirley
 

1901 births
1955 deaths
People from Snow Hill, North Carolina
Washington Senators (1901–1960) players
Major League Baseball first basemen
Baseball players from North Carolina
Jersey City Skeeters players
Hartford Senators players
Mobile Bears players
Rochester Tribe players
Greenville Spinners players
Birmingham Barons players
Asheville Tourists players
Minneapolis Millers (baseball) players
Atlanta Crackers players
Chattanooga Lookouts players
Chattanooga Lookouts managers
Dallas Steers players
Nashville Vols players
Knoxville Smokies players
Martinsburg Blue Sox players
Wilkes-Barre Barons (baseball) players
Little Rock Travelers players
Jackson Generals (KITTY League) players
Lenoir Reds players